Jason John Pearson (born December 29, 1975) is a former professional baseball pitcher. He played in  Major League Baseball (MLB) for the San Diego Padres in 2002 and the St. Louis Cardinals in 2003.

Biography
Pearson attended Freeport High School in Freeport, Illinois, and Illinois State University.

Pearson was signed as an undrafted free agent by the Florida Marlins in June 1998. He played minor league baseball during 1998 and from 2001 to 2006; he played independent baseball in 1999, 2000, 2005, and from 2008 to 2010. He appeared in 288 minor league games and 166 independent league games.

Pearson pitched in four major league games. In June 2002, he made two relief appearances for the San Diego Padres, pitching a total of  scoreless innings while allowing one hit and striking out three batters. In August 2003, he made two relief appearances for the St. Louis Cardinals, pitching a total of one inning while allowing seven runs on four hits and three walks while striking out one batter. Overall, Pearson pitched  innings in the major leagues while allowing seven runs, for a 23.62 earned run average (ERA).

References

External links

1975 births
Living people
Baseball players from Illinois
Major League Baseball pitchers
San Diego Padres players
St. Louis Cardinals players
Bowie Baysox players
Fargo-Moorhead RedHawks players
Fresno Grizzlies players
Gulf Coast Marlins players
Kane County Cougars players
Memphis Redbirds players
Mobile BayBears players
Nashua Pride players
Portland Sea Dogs players
Portland Beavers players
Sioux Falls Canaries players
Southern Maryland Blue Crabs players
Tennessee Smokies players
Illinois State Redbirds baseball players
Edmonton Capitals players
Freeport High School (Illinois) alumni